The Korea national under-19 basketball team represents South Korea in international basketball competitions. It is governed by the Korea Basketball Association (KBA). It represents the country in international under-19 and under-18 (under age 19 and under age 18) basketball competitions.

See also 
 South Korea national basketball team
 South Korea women's national basketball team
 South Korea national under-17 basketball team

References

Korea, South
Basketball